Poshteh (also known as Pushteh and Pushtekh) is a village in Rostamabad-e Jonubi Rural District, in the Central District of Rudbar County, Gilan Province, Iran. At the 2006 census, its population was 47, in 13 families.

References 

Populated places in Rudbar County